

List of tournaments

See also
World Judo Championships

 
World Combat Games